The 2015–16 LNFA season was the 22nd season of American football in Spain.

Teams were divided into three categories, named Serie A, B and C, with promotion and relegation between them.

Badalona Dracs won their seventh title, a record for the tournament.

LNFA Serie A

Stadia and locations

Six teams entered the LNFA Serie A, the top-tier level of American football in Spain. Rivas Osos, Valencia Firebats, Valencia Giants and Badalona Dracs repeated from last year. Barberà Rookies and Reus Imperials were promoted from last year LNFA Serie B.

On December 28, the three teams from the Community of Madrid (Rivas Osos from Serie A, Camioneros Coslada and Las Rozas Black Demons from Serie B) were excluded from the competition as they did not have a junior team in the junior league.

Regular season

Playoffs

Promotion/relegation playoffs
On June 12, the fifth placed team in Serie A, Valencia Giants, played against Serie B runner-up, L'Hospitalet Pioners. Giants won the game and will play in next year Serie A.

|}

LNFA Serie B

Seven teams played the Serie B in 2016. L'Hospitalet Pioners and Mallorca Voltors were relegated from previous Serie A season. Gijón Mariners were promoted from Serie C in 2015.

The nine original teams were reduced to seven on December 28, when the Spanish Federation of American Football excluded the two teams from the Community of Madrid (Las Rozas Black Demons and Camioneros Coslada) arguing that they did not have junior teams in the junior league, one of the criteria to play the Serie A or B.

Murcia Cobras won the Serie B, and promoted to next year Serie A Season. L'Hospitalet Pioners, as runner-up, played  a promotion game against the last team in 2015–16 Serie A, Valencia Giants, but lost it and remained in Serie B.

Group Odd

Group Even

Promotion playoffs

LNFA Serie C
The Serie C was composed by the Regional and interregional leagues. The top 8 teams could qualify to the promotion playoffs, but finally only two teams signed up for the playoffs.  The three teams from the Community of Madrid that were excluded in December 2015 from the 2015–16 season took part in the promotion playoffs.

Rivas Osos won the Serie C, and promoted to next year Serie B Season.

Andalusian League

Catalan League

Madrid League

East Conference

Northern League

Playoffs
The top 8 teams could qualify to the promotion playoffs, but finally only two teams signed up for these. The three teams from the Community of Madrid that were excluded in December 2015 from the 2015–16 season will take part in the promotion playoffs.

The champion of the Serie C will promote directly to Serie B, while the runner-up must play one more game against a Serie B team.

Tiebreakers
The two teams were ranked based on these criteria:
higher percentage of wins
lower average of points allowed
superior point difference average
lower average of players sent off
lucky draw

Ranking

Bracket

References

External links
FEFA American Football Spanish Federation
Results and information of Spanish leagues

Liga Nacional de Fútbol Americano
2015 in Spanish sport
2016 in Spanish sport
2016 in American football